The Commander-in-chief of the Chilean Air Force is chief of the Chilean Air Force. He also commands operations, administration and logistics within the air force.

The current Commander-in-Chief is Air General Hugo Rodríguez González. He was appointed by President Gabriel Boric on 5 November 2022.

List

See also
Chilean Air Force
List of commanders-in-chief of the Chilean Army
List of commanders-in-chief of the Chilean Navy

References

Chilean Air Force officers
Chilean Air Force generals
Chile